The Guyana women's national field hockey team represents Guyana in women's international field hockey competitions.

Tournament history

Pan American Cup
2013 – 8th place

Central American and Caribbean Games
2010 – 5th place
2014 – 6th place
2018 – 7th place

Pan American Challenge
2011 –

See also
Guyana men's national field hockey team

References

Americas women's national field hockey teams
National team
Field hockey